is a rakugo performer. With his comic group, Rokunin-no-Kai (Group of Six), formed in 2003, he has helped to popularise rakugo among young Japanese people. He is also well known as a TV presenter, and has presented the primetime NHK General show  since it started in 1995.

Tatekawa received the grand prize Sponichi Art & Culture Award in 2008 for "Shinosuke Rakugo in Parco".

Filmography

Television
Taiyō ni Hoero! (1976), mechanic (episode 196)
Tameshite Gatten (1995–2022), host

Film
GeGeGe no Kitarō (2007), Bakezōri (voice)
The Tale of the Princess Kaguya (2013), Inbe no Akita (voice)
A Living Promise (2016), Yōsuke Kondō
The Island of Cats (2019), Daikichi
Poupelle of Chimney Town (2020) (voice)
Angry Rice Wives (2021)
Dreaming of the Meridian Arc (2022)

Honours
Medal with Purple Ribbon (2015)

Notes

1954 births
Living people
Rakugoka
Recipients of the Medal with Purple Ribbon